Lviv Oblast is subdivided into districts (raions) which are subdivided into territorial communities (hromadas).

Current

On 18 July 2020, the number of districts was reduced to seven. These are:
 Chervonohrad (Червоноградський район), the center is in the town of Chervonohrad;
 Drohobych (Дрогобицький район), the center is in the town of Drohobych; 
 Lviv (Львівський район), the center is in the city of Lviv;
 Sambir (Самбірський район), the center is in the town of Sambir;
 Stryi (Стрийський район), the center is in the town of Stryi;
 Yavoriv (Яворівський район), the center is in the town of Yavoriv;
 Zolochiv (Золочівський район), the center is in the town of Zolochiv.

Administrative divisions until 2020

Before July 2020, Lviv Oblast was subdivided into 29 regions: 20 districts (raions) and 9 city municipalities (mis'krada or misto), officially known as territories governed by city councils.

Cities under the oblast's jurisdiction:
Lviv Municipality
Cities and towns under the city's jurisdiction:
Lviv (Львів), the administrative center of the oblast
Vynnyky (Винники)
Urban-type settlements under the city's jurisdiction:
Briukhovychi (Брюховичі)
Rudne (Рудне)
Boryslav Municipality
Cities and towns under the city's jurisdiction:
Boryslav (Борислав)
Urban-type settlements under the city's jurisdiction:
Skhidnytsia (Східниця)
Chervonohrad Municipality
Cities and towns under the city's jurisdiction:
Chervonohrad (Червоноград)
Urban-type settlements under the city's jurisdiction:
Hirnyk (Гірник)
Drohobych Municipality
Cities and towns under the city's jurisdiction:
Drohobych (Дрогобич)
Stebnyk (Стебник)
Morshyn (Моршин)
Novyi Rozdil (Новий Розділ)
Sambir (Самбір)
Stryi (Стрий)
Truskavets (Трускавець)
Districts (raions):
Brody (Бродівський район)
Cities and towns under the district's jurisdiction:
Brody (Броди)
Urban-type settlements under the district's jurisdiction:
Pidkamin (Підкамінь)
Busk (Буський район)
Cities and towns under the district's jurisdiction:
Busk (Буськ)
Urban-type settlements under the district's jurisdiction:
Krasne (Красне)
Olesko (Олесько)
Drohobych (Дрогобицький район)
Urban-type settlements under the district's jurisdiction:
Medenychi (Меденичі)
Pidbuzh (Підбуж)
Horodok (Городоцький район)
Cities and towns under the district's jurisdiction:
Horodok (Городок)
Komarno (Комарно)
Urban-type settlements under the district's jurisdiction:
Velykyi Liubin (Великий Любінь)
Kamianka-Buzka (Кам'янка-Бузький район)
Cities and towns under the district's jurisdiction:
Kamianka-Buzka (Кам'янка-Бузька)
Urban-type settlements under the district's jurisdiction:
Dobrotvir (Добротвір)
Novyi Yarychiv (Новий Яричів)
Zapytiv (Запитів)
Mostyska (Мостиський район)
Cities and towns under the district's jurisdiction:
Mostyska (Мостиська)
Sudova Vyshnia (Судова Вишня)
Mykolaiv (Миколаївський район)
Cities and towns under the district's jurisdiction:
Mykolaiv (Миколаїв)
Urban-type settlements under the district's jurisdiction:
Rozdil (Розділ)
Peremyshliany (Перемишлянський район)
Cities and towns under the district's jurisdiction:
Bibrka (Бібрка)
Peremyshliany (Перемишляни)
Pustomyty (Пустомитівський район)
Cities and towns under the district's jurisdiction:
Pustomyty (Пустомити)
Urban-type settlements under the district's jurisdiction:
Shchyrets (Щирець)
Radekhiv (Радехівський район)
Cities and towns under the district's jurisdiction:
Radekhiv (Радехів)
Urban-type settlements under the district's jurisdiction:
Lopatyn (Лопатин)
Sambir (Самбірський район)
Cities and towns under the district's jurisdiction:
Novyi Kalyniv (Новий Калинів)
Rudky (Рудки)
Urban-type settlements under the district's jurisdiction:
Dubliany (Дубляни)
Skole (Сколівський район)
Cities and towns under the district's jurisdiction:
Skole (Сколе)
Urban-type settlements under the district's jurisdiction:
Slavske (Славське)
Verkhnie Synovydne (Верхнє Синьовидне)
Sokal (Сокальський район)
Cities and towns under the district's jurisdiction:
Belz (Белз)
Sokal (Сокаль)
Sosnivka (Соснівка)
Uhniv (Угнів)
Velyki Mosty (Великі Мости)
Urban-type settlements under the district's jurisdiction:
Zhvyrka (Жвирка)
Staryi Sambir (Старосамбірський район)
Cities and towns under the district's jurisdiction:
Dobromyl (Добромиль)
Khyriv (Хирів)
Staryi Sambir (Старий Самбір)
Urban-type settlements under the district's jurisdiction:
Nyzhankovychi (Нижанковичі)
Stara Sil (Стара Сіль)
Stryi (Стрийський район)
Urban-type settlements under the district's jurisdiction:
Dashava (Дашава)
Turka (Турківський район)
Cities and towns under the district's jurisdiction:
Turka (Турка)
Urban-type settlements under the district's jurisdiction:
Borynia (Бориня)
Yavoriv (Яворівський район)
Cities and towns under the district's jurisdiction:
Novoiavorivsk (Новояворівськ)
Yavoriv (Яворів)
Urban-type settlements under the district's jurisdiction:
Ivano-Frankove (Івано-Франкове)
Krakovets (Краковець)
Nemyriv (Немирів)
Shklo (Шкло)
Zhovkva (Жовківський район)
Cities and towns under the district's jurisdiction:
Dubliany (Дубляни)
Rava-Ruska (Рава-Руська)
Zhovkva (Жовква)
Urban-type settlements under the district's jurisdiction:
Kulykiv (Куликів)
Maheriv (Магерів)
Zhydachiv (Жидачівський район)
Cities and towns under the district's jurisdiction:
Khodoriv (Ходорів)
Zhydachiv (Жидачів)
Urban-type settlements under the district's jurisdiction:
Hnizdychiv (Гніздичів)
Novi Strilyshcha (Нові Стрілища)
Zhuravne (Журавне)
Zolochiv (Золочівський район)
Cities and towns under the district's jurisdiction:
Hlyniany (Глиняни)
Zolochiv (Золочів)
Urban-type settlements under the district's jurisdiction:
Pomoriany (Поморяни)

References

Lviv
Lviv Oblast